The 1978 Argentine Grand Prix was a Formula One motor race held on 15 January 1978 at Buenos Aires. It was the first race of the 1978 World Championship of F1 Drivers and the 1978 International Cup for F1 Constructors. The 52-lap race was won from pole position by American driver Mario Andretti, driving a Lotus-Ford, with Austrian Niki Lauda second in a Brabham-Alfa Romeo and Frenchman Patrick Depailler third in a Tyrrell-Ford. This was the debut of multiple-time Constructors' Champions, Williams.

Overview
Mario Andretti took pole in his Lotus, with Carlos Reutemann's Ferrari joining him on the front row and Ronnie Peterson in the other Lotus third on the grid. The start was uneventful, with Andretti and Reutemann easily keeping first and second, with John Watson in the Brabham taking third from Peterson. Watson took second from Reutemann on the seventh lap, but Andretti was uncatchable. Reutemann ran third for a while, but then began to drop down the order, and so reigning world champion Niki Lauda took third in his Brabham, which became second with ten laps left when Watson's engine blew up. Andretti motored on to a crushing victory, with Lauda second and Patrick Depailler's Tyrrell taking the final spot on the podium ahead of James Hunt in the leading McLaren, Ronnie Peterson in the other Lotus and Patrick Tambay in the other McLaren.

Classification

Qualifying classification 

*Positions in red indicate entries that failed to qualify.

Race classification

Championship standings after the race

Drivers' Championship standings

Constructors' Championship standings

References

Argentine Grand Prix
Argentine Grand Prix
Grand Prix
Argentine Grand Prix